Estaj (also Romanized as Estāj; also known as Estāch and Usmaj) is a village in Khavashod Rural District, Rud Ab District, Sabzevar County, Razavi Khorasan Province, Iran. At the 2006 census, its population was 267, in 121 families.

References 

Populated places in Sabzevar County